The Williams FW42 was a Formula One racing car designed by Paddy Lowe, Doug McKiernan and Dave Wheater for the ROKiT Williams Racing team, to compete in the 2019 FIA Formula One World Championship. The car made its competitive debut at the 2019 Australian Grand Prix, driven by the reigning 2018 FIA Formula 2 Champion George Russell who was making his Formula One début; and Robert Kubica, who returned for his first racing season in Formula One since 2010, after recovering from life-threatening injuries suffered in a rally car accident in early 2011.

Development and testing 
The Williams FW42 was forced to miss the first two days of pre-season testing as the car had not been completed in time. The car finally got out on track during the middle of the third day of testing, and its first shakedown was performed by Russell who completed 23 laps. Throughout the remaining days of testing the team mostly conducted aero tests, with the drivers running a limited number of flying laps due to setbacks in the car's development, lack of parts, and the track time lost during the team's absence during the first two and a half days of testing. The car completed 567 laps during the tests, the fewest of any teams, and was unable to match the pace of other competitors. Its fastest time was 1.9 seconds slower than the quickest lap of testing posted by Sebastian Vettel driving for Ferrari, and over half a second behind the rest of the grid.

Competition history 
The car arrived on the season opener in Australia with re-designed parts of the front suspension, bargeboards, and mirrors after those elements of the car were declared illegal by the FIA during the pre-season testing. During the first two practice sessions, the car presented itself with very slow pace, and was even further down the grid than during the winter testing. On Saturday there was no improvement, as both drivers qualified on the back of the grid, with Russell in front of Kubica but was three seconds behind the McLaren of Carlos Sainz. The race was a disaster for the team, as both drivers crossed the line adrift of the field with George Russell and Robert Kubica taking respectively the 16th and 17th spot, capitalizing only on three drivers who didn't finish the race. The team found no success during the first half of the season despite upgrades to the car.  It wasn't until Germany that they finally broke through with Kubica finishing 10th and scoring their first point of the season, capitalising on 7 drivers that failed to complete the full race distance and after both Alfa Romeo drivers (who finished 7th and 8th) received severe time penalties for driver aids at the start of the race. At the Hungarian Grand Prix, Williams showed signs of progress after Russell narrowly missed out on Q2, and was able to carry this progress into the race. The following round saw Kubica failing to qualify because of an engine failure and having to start from the pit lane while Russell started 14th on the grid because of multiple drivers taking grid penalties despite qualifying 19th. A similar situation saw both cars start in the top 15 for the first time in Italy because of the same reason. Their classified finish streak took a tumble when George Russell retired from a collision on lap 34 at the Singapore Grand Prix. Due to Russell crashing into the barriers following brake issues, and Williams deciding to retire Kubica in order to conserve parts, the following round in Russia saw their first double retirement since the 2018 German Grand Prix. During qualifying at Suzuka, Kubica crashed his car after hitting the outside wall at the exit of turn 18, after running wide onto the grass destroying the car's front wing and left-hand wheels, causing significant damage to the survival cell, thus forcing the Williams mechanics to change the Pole's chassis and gearbox, forcing him to start in the pitlane.

Complete Formula One results
(key)

References

External links

Williams Formula One cars
2019 Formula One season cars